The Philippines is set to participate at the 32nd Southeast Asian Games which was held from 5 to 16 May 2023 in Phnom Penh, Cambodia.

Preparation
The Philippine delegation to the 2023 Southeast Asian Games is planned to compose of 814 athletes in all sports. with Chito Loyzaga as the chef de mission.

The Philippines intend to participate in all 38 sports with 905 athletes. For non-traditional sports, they plan to employ athletes who play a similar discipline such as traditional swimmers for fin swimming and kickboxers for Kun Bokator. The national delegation also had to contend with the 70 percent participation limit in combat sports or martial arts; a quota not applicable to the hosts.

Volleyball

The Philippine women's national team is planned to consist of a mix of professional and youth amateur players. There was also plans to send the core of the champions of the 2022 Premier Volleyball League Reinforced Conference to the regional tournament.

References

2023 in Philippine sport
2023 Southeast Asian Games